Esther Morales Fernández (born 9 August 1985 in Barcelona) is an S10 swimmer from Spain.

Personal 
She was born August 9, 1985, in Barcelona. In 2012, she lived in Palma de Mallorca, Balearic Islands.

Swimming 
In 2007, she competed at the IDM German Open. At the 2009 IPC  European Swimming Championship in Reykjavík, Iceland, Sarai Gascón Moreno, Ana Rubio, Morales and Julia Castelló won a bronze medal in the 4x100 meter medley relay. In 2010, she competed at the Tenerife International Open.  Before the 2010 Adapted Swimming World Championship in the Netherlands, she went to a swimming camp with the national team that was part of the Paralympic High Performance Program (HARP Program). Eindhoven, Netherlands hosted  the 2010 World Swimming Championships at which she competed.  She qualified for the 50 meter freestyle finals, where she finished fifth.  She also competed in the 100 meter backstroke event.  She was one of four Spanish swimmers at the World Championships that were affiliated with CTEIB, an institute created by the Government of the Balearic Islands intended to provide an education to elite high-performance sportspeople. From the Catalan region of Spain, she was a recipient of a 2012 Plan ADO scholarship. In 2013, she competed in the Championship of Spain by Autonomous Open Paralympic Swimming where she represented the Balearic Islands.

Paralympics 
Morales competed at the 2000 Summer Paralympics, where she did not medal. She competed at the 2004 Summer Paralympics, where she won a pair of bronze medals in the 50 meter freestyle and the 100 meter backstroke.  She competed at the 2008 Summer Paralympics, where she won a bronze in the 100 meter backstroke. She competed at the 2012 Summer Paralympics, where she did not medal. She, Sarai Gascón Moreno, Teresa Perales and Isabel Yingüa Hernández finished fourth in the 4x100 meter freestyle relay event.  She competed at the 2012 Summer Paralympics in the 50 meter freestyle.  Her first race was the 4 x 100 meter freestyle relay.

References

External links 
 
 

1985 births
Living people
Spanish female backstroke swimmers
Spanish female freestyle swimmers
Paralympic swimmers of Spain
Paralympic bronze medalists for Spain
Paralympic medalists in swimming
Swimmers at the 2000 Summer Paralympics
Swimmers at the 2004 Summer Paralympics
Swimmers at the 2008 Summer Paralympics
Swimmers at the 2012 Summer Paralympics
Medalists at the 2004 Summer Paralympics
Medalists at the 2008 Summer Paralympics
Mediterranean Games gold medalists for Spain
Mediterranean Games medalists in swimming
Swimmers at the 2001 Mediterranean Games
Swimmers at the 2009 Mediterranean Games
Swimmers at the 2013 Mediterranean Games
Medalists at the World Para Swimming Championships
Medalists at the World Para Swimming European Championships
Plan ADOP alumni
S10-classified Paralympic swimmers
Swimmers from Barcelona
21st-century Spanish women